Víctor Félix Flores Morales (born 6 March 1939) is a Mexican trade union leader and politician affiliated with the Institutional Revolutionary Party. As of 2014 he served as Deputy of the LVII and LIX Legislatures of the Mexican Congress as a plurinominal representative.

References

1939 births
Living people
People from Veracruz (city)
Mexican trade unionists
Members of the Chamber of Deputies (Mexico)
Institutional Revolutionary Party politicians
Politicians from Veracruz
21st-century Mexican politicians
Universidad Veracruzana alumni
Deputies of the LIX Legislature of Mexico